Conus villepinii, common name Villepin's cone is a species of sea snail, a marine gastropod mollusk in the family Conidae, the cone snails and their allies.

Like all species within the genus Conus, these snails are predatory and venomous. They are capable of "stinging" humans, therefore live ones should be handled carefully or not at all.

Distribution
Locus typicus: Marie Galante de Guadeloupe, Lesser Antilles.
The whereabouts of the original type specimen is unknown. 

This marine species occurs from Florida to Southern Brasil and off Bermuda. 
The species is better known from the Gulf of Mexico (trawler) sources.

Immature specimens with purplish background colour, dredged off Barbados,
may have been described as Conus hunti, Wils & Moolenbeek, 1979. 
The coloration of the living animal of these immature Barbados specimens of around 20 mm. in overall length
is a dirty-white with flecks of black, and black fringing at the edge of the mantle and siphonal canal.

The type locality of Conus sanderi, Wils & Moolenbeek, 1979 is off St. James, west coast of Barbados West Indies, where type material was dredged at 155–180 metres depth by R.V. Martlet, operating from Bellairs Research Institute of McGill University. 
This species also known from as far south as Eastern Brasil.

Description 
The maximum recorded shell length is 93 mm.

Habitat 
Minimum recorded depth is 25 m. Maximum recorded depth is 475 m.

Cone shells looking very similar in appearance to the shell presented as the type illustration of C.villepinii have been dredged off West coast of Barbados, Lesser Antilles at depths around 85 fms/510 feet.

References

 Tucker J.K. & Tenorio M.J. (2013) Illustrated catalog of the living cone shells. 517 pp. Wellington, Florida: MdM Publishing.
 Puillandre N., Duda T.F., Meyer C., Olivera B.M. & Bouchet P. (2015). One, four or 100 genera? A new classification of the cone snails. Journal of Molluscan Studies. 81: 1-23

External links
 The Conus Biodiversity website
 Cone Shells - Knights of the Sea
 
 Vink & Sander, Systematics and Distribution of Conus sanderi s.l.; The Veliger v.25 (1982-1983)

villepinii
Gastropods described in 1857